The Qatar International Ice Hockey League is the ice hockey league in Qatar. It was first contested in 2003.

History 
The Qatar International Ice Hockey League (QIIHL) was founded in 2003. Usually league games are played at the Villaggio Ice Rink of the Villagio Shopping Mall in Doha. Due to the different play levels, the league is divided into two divisions (A and B). Since 2007, the Desert Cup is also played in the country. It is planned to install a team with only domestic players to form a national ice hockey team.

In 2010, the QIIHL sponsored the 2010 Red Bull Crashed Ice qualification tournament in Qatar. The competition was won by Bill Chase, a SandVipers (QIIHL) player.

Lance Mierendorf and Richard Labrosse founded the QIIHL in 2003. The Mierendorf Labrosse Cup is awarded to the QIIHL Championship team.

Teams 2017-18

Division A 
 Rink Rats
 SandVipers
 Oil Kings

Division B 
 CNAQ Breakers
 Molson Canadians
 Qatar Oil Kings
 Qatar Oryx

Former Teams 
 Desert Heat
 European Fitness Club
 Ice Cruisers
 Qatar Gas
 Q-Chem
 RasGas
 Sandstorm
 Sun Dogs

Champions 
2017 (winter): Rink Rats (Division A), CNAQ Breakers (Division B)
2016 (fall): Hammerheads (Division A), Canadians (Division B) 
2016 (winter): Rink Rats (Division A), Canadians (Division B)
2015 (fall): Hammerheads (Division A), CNAQ Breakers (Division B)
2015 (winter): CNAQ Breakers (Division A), CNAQ Breakers (Division B)
2014 (fall): CNAQ Breakers (Division A), Qatar Oryx (Division B)
2014 (winter): three divisions held - A, B, C
2013 (fall): SandVipers (Division A), Sun Dogs (Division B)
2013 (winter): Division A teams: Canadians, Hammerheads, SandVipers, Division B teams: Sun Dogs, CNAQ Breakers, Ice Cruisers, RasGas 
2012 2nd Half: Canadians (Division A), unknown (Division B)
2012 1st Half: SandVipers (Division A), unknown (Division B)
2011 2nd Half A: unknown
2011 2nd Half B: unknown
2011 1st Half A: unknown
2011 1st Half B: unknown
2010/11: RasGas
2009/10: SandVipers
2008/09: European Fitness Club
2007/08: Hammerheads
2006/07: CNAQ Breakers
2005/06: Desert Heat
2004: Q-Chem
2003: Ice Cruisers

Past Presidents 
2019-Now:. Jeff Agnew
2017-2019: Kristian Walgren
2016-2017: John McMahon
2014-2016: Jeff Agnew
2013-2014: Darcy Webster
2010-2013: Greg Scott
2008-2010: Rob Carter
2006-2008: Greg Scott
2005-2006: Jeff Robinson
2003-2005: Lance Mierendorf

References

External links
www.qhockey.com

Ice hockey leagues in Asia
Ice hockey
Ice hockey in Qatar